The 5,000 Fingers of Dr. T. is a 1953 American musical fantasy film about a boy who dreams himself into a fantasy world ruled by a diabolical piano teacher enslaving children to practice piano forever. It was the only feature film written by Theodor Seuss Geisel (Dr. Seuss), who wrote the story, screenplay, and lyrics. It was directed by Roy Rowland, with many uncredited takes directed by producer Stanley Kramer. The film stars Peter Lind Hayes, Mary Healy, Hans Conried, and Tommy Rettig.

Plot
Young Bart Collins (Tommy Rettig) lives with his widowed mother Heloise (Mary Healy). The bane of Bart's existence is the hated piano lessons he endures under the tutelage of the autocratic Dr. Terwilliker (Hans Conried). Bart feels that his mother has fallen under Terwilliker's influence, and gripes to their plumber, August Zabladowski (Peter Lind Hayes), without result. While hammering at his lessons, Bart dozes off and enters a musical dream.

In the dream, Bart is trapped at the surreal Terwilliker Institute, where the piano teacher is a madman dictator who has imprisoned non-piano-playing musicians. He built a piano so large that it requires Bart and 499 other boys (hence, 5,000 fingers) to play it. Bart's mother has become Terwilliker's hypnotized assistant and bride-to-be, and Bart must dodge the Institute's guards as he scrambles to save his mother and himself. He tries to recruit Mr. Zabladowski, who was hired to install the Institute's lavatories ahead of a vital inspection, but only after skepticism and foot-dragging is Zabladowski convinced to help. The two construct a noise-sucking contraption which ruins the mega-piano's opening concert. The enslaved boys run riot, and the "atomic" noise-sucker explodes in spectacular fashion, bringing Bart out from his dream.

The movie ends on a hopeful note for Bart, when Mr. Zabladowski notices Heloise and offers to drive her to town in his jeep. Bart escapes from the piano and runs down the street to play, with his dog Sport joyfully capering at his heels.

Cast
 Peter Lind Hayes as August Zabladowski
 Mary Healy as Heloise Collins
 Hans Conried as Dr. Terwilliker
 Tommy Rettig as Bart Collins
 John Heasley as Uncle Whitney
 Robert Heasley as Uncle Judson
 Noel Cravat as Sgt. Lunk

Uncredited (in order of appearance) 
 Henry Kulky as Stroogo
 George Chakiris as Dancer
 Tony Butala as Boy pianist
 Harry Wilson as Guard / doorman

Production
In the wake of the success of Gerald McBoing-Boing, Geisel submitted a live-action storyline for The 5,000 Fingers of Dr. T. in 1951.  Geisel followed it up with a 1200-page script, with "themes of world dominance and oppression coming out of World War II."  Geisel relocated from La Jolla, California, to Los Angeles during filming to "enable him to be more involved in the production." His influence on set design and choreography is also evident in the film.

Hans Conried was enthusiastic about the role, saying in retrospect, "I had never had any such part before, never have since and probably never will again. We rehearsed for eight weeks before I was engaged to shoot for eight weeks, an extravagance that I as a bit player had never known ... If it had been a success, with my prominent part in the title role, it would have changed my life."

Prior to release, a "preview version" was received poorly by a test audience. This prompted heavy cuts from the studio and a week of reshoots included a new opening scene. Of the original 20 musical numbers filmed in their entirety, 9 were removed. The removed songs still survive with the complete musical soundtrack. The "preview version" featuring the removed footage is considered lost. Columbia Pictures released the film a second time in 1958 with the whole elevator scene cut, under the title Crazy Music.

Musical score
The score was composed by Frederick Hollander with lyrics by Dr. Seuss. It earned an Oscar nomination for "Best Scoring of a Musical Picture".

The singing voice of Tommy Rettig was dubbed by Tony Butala, the founder of The Lettermen.

The pre-recorded piano parts were performed  uncredited by veteran Hollywood studio session pianist Ray Turner (1903-1971), who was known to the public for his own recordings, and for his piano performance on the popular 1948 children's album Sparky's Magic Piano.

Musical numbers
Theatrical cut:
 "Opening Credits / Butterfly Ballet" — Dream Sequence
 "Ten Happy Fingers"
 "Piano Concerto (Ten Happy Fingers variation)"
 "Dream Stuff"
 "Hypnotic Duel"
 "Get Together Weather"
 "Because We're Kids"
 "Dungeon Ballet"
 "We Are Victorious"
 "Dressing Song / Do-Mi-Do Duds"
 "End Credits"<ref name=Eder>See the review of the 2007 CD: {{ cite web |last=Eder |first=Bruce |url=http://www.allmusic.com/album/the-5000-fingers-of-dr-t-songs-and-music-from-the-original-soundtrack-mw0000505145 |title=The 5000 Fingers of Dr. T — Songs and Music from the Original Soundtrack |date=2007 |work=AllMusic }}</ref>

Original "preview" version:
 "Overture/Main Title"
 "Ten Happy Fingers"
 "Piano Concerto (Ten Happy Fingers variation)"
 "Oh! We Are the Guards"
 "Many Questions"
 "My Favorite Note"
 "Dungeon Ballet"
 "Grindstone"
 "I Will Not Get Involved"
 "Dream Stuff"
 "I Won't Go to Bed/Massage Opera"
 "You Opened My Eyes"
 "Hypnotic Duel"
 "Because We're Kids"
 "Money"
 "Freckle on a Pygmy"
 "Butterfly Ballet"
 "We Are Victorious"
 "Dressing Song / Do-Mi-Do Duds"
 "End Credits"

Reception 
At the Hollywood premiere, patrons walked out after 15 minutes, and box-office receipts were disappointing. At the time it was released, the film received negative reviews from critics.  Bosley Crowther called the film "strange and confused" and said:
this [film] is not only abstruse in its symbols and in its vast elaboration of reveries but [is] also dismally lacking in the humor or the enchantment such an item should contain.

Geisel regarded the film as a "debaculous fiasco" and omitted mention of it in his official biography. He even stated after the film "Hollywood is not suited for me and I am not suited for it".

21st century
The home media releases of the film have spawned many new reviews. In 2001, Glenn Erickson wrote that the film was "another flop that has since gained the reputation of an artsy classic - a real cult film.  It's colorful, energetic, and indeed can boast fine work by a cadre of talented Hollywoodians. But it's not very good." Later critics were more enthusiastic. In 2002, Peter Bradshaw said the film "has charm, a riotous imagination, and some very weird dream-like sets by production designer Rudolph Sternad and art director Cary Odell"; it's "surreal, disturbing, strong meat for young stomachs."  In 2005, Violet Glaze of the Baltimore City Paper'' called the film "refreshingly tart and defiant for a children's film, its space-age-by-way-of-Caligari world parks right on the delicious side of creepy. Bring the kids, especially the smart ones." In 2008, Dennis Schwartz wrote that it was "probably the best children's fantasy film ever made by Hollywood—even if it's rambling."

Home media
The film was released by RCA/Columbia Pictures Home Video in 1991. It was then re-released in 1995, as part of the Columbia Tristar family collection. It became available on DVD in 2001 by Columbia Tristar Home Entertainment. It featured the Gerald McBoing-Boing short, Gerald McBoing-Boing’s Symphony, as a bonus feature. Sony then re-released the  DVD in 2008 as part of the Stanley Kramer collection. Finally, it was released as a region 1 Blu-Ray and DVD in 2016 by Mill Creek Entertainment, under licence from Sony.

Soundtrack
The music that was composed for the film, including material that was not used in the extant copies of the film itself, was released as a set of 3 CDs in 2010. In 2007, a soundtrack CD (ACMEM126CD) was released by Él Records in association with Cherry Red Records.

References

External links

 
 
 
 
 

1953 films
1950s musical fantasy films
American musical fantasy films
Films with screenplays by Dr. Seuss
1950s English-language films
Columbia Pictures films
Films about dreams
Films directed by Roy Rowland
Films produced by Stanley Kramer
Films scored by Friedrich Hollaender
Films scored by Morris Stoloff
1950s American films